Cipoia is a genus of flowering plants belonging to the family Podostemaceae.

Its native range is Southeastern Brazil.

Species 
Cipoia inserta 
Cipoia ramosa

References

Podostemaceae
Malpighiales genera